John Kelvin Koelsch (December 22, 1923 – October 16, 1951) was a United States Navy officer and a recipient of America's highest military decoration — the Medal of Honor — for his actions in the Korean War. He was the first helicopter pilot to be awarded the Medal of Honor.

Biography
John Kelvin Koelsch was born in London and was educated at the Choate School and Princeton University. He served in the British RAF and fought in The Blitz before he joined the U.S. Naval Reserve as an aviation cadet on September 14, 1942, and was commissioned as an ensign on October 23, 1944, after completing flight training he served in the Pacific War. During the next few years, he served at Naval Air Stations at Fort Lauderdale, Florida, and Norfolk, Virginia, and subsequently flew with Composite Squadron 15 and Torpedo Squadrons 97 and 18. He became an accomplished torpedo bomber pilot, and was promoted to lieutenant (junior grade) on August 1, 1946. Despite first entering Princeton in September 1941, he returned to the University after the war, and finally graduated in 1949.

After the outbreak of the Korean War, he joined Helicopter Squadron 1 (HU-1) at Miramar, California, in August 1950. As Officer in Charge of a helicopter detachment, he joined  in October for pilot rescue duty off the eastern coast of Korea. He served in Princeton until June 1951, when he joined Helicopter Squadron 2 (HU-2) for pilot rescue duty off Wonsan, Korea, then under naval blockade. He provided lifeguard duty for pilots who were downed either in coastal waters or over enemy-held territory. On June 22, he rescued a naval aviator from the waters of Wonsan Harbor, southeast of Yo Do Island.

Wilkins parachuted from his burning plane at low altitude and survived, despite being severely burned about the legs. Despite approaching darkness, worsening weather, and enemy ground fire, Koelsch located the downed aviator in the Anbyon Valley and began his pickup. Thick fog prevented the air cover from protecting the unarmed HO3S helicopter, and intense enemy fire downed the craft as crewman George M. Neal, AM3, hoisted the injured pilot toward the helicopter. All three men survived the crash; and, after hiding in the mountains from enemy patrols for three days, they began a slow march to the coast. After six more days, they reached a coastal village where they were captured the following day while hiding in a hut. During his captivity, though beaten and abused, Koelsch refused to aid his captors or submit to interrogation. His fortitude and personal bravery inspired his fellow prisoners. 

Koelsch died of malnutrition and dysentery on October 16, 1951, while a prisoner of war. On August 3, 1955, he was posthumously awarded the Medal of Honor for his actions in Korea.

He is buried at Arlington National Cemetery, Arlington, Virginia. His grave can be found in section 30, grave 1123-RH.

Medal of Honor citation

Lieutenant (jg) Koelsch's official citation reads:
For conspicuous gallantry and intrepidity at the risk of his life above and beyond the call of duty while serving with a Navy helicopter rescue unit in North Korea on 3 July 1951. Although darkness was rapidly approaching when information was received that a Marine aviator had been shot down and was trapped by the enemy in mountainous terrain deep in hostile territory, Lieutenant (Junior Grade) Koelsch voluntarily flew a helicopter to the reported position of the downed airman in an attempt to effect a rescue. With an almost solid overcast concealing everything below the mountain peaks, he descended in his unarmed and vulnerable aircraft without the accompanying fighter escort to an extremely low altitude beneath the cloud level and began a systematic search. Despite the increasingly intense enemy fire, which struck his helicopter on one occasion, he persisted in his mission until he succeeded in locating the downed pilot, who was suffering from serious burns on the arms and legs. While the victim was being hoisted into the aircraft, it was struck again by an accurate burst of hostile fire and crashed on the side of the mountain. Quickly extricating his crewmen and the aviator from the wreckage, Lieutenant (Junior Grade) Koelsch led them from the vicinity in an effort to escape from hostile troops, evading the enemy forces for 9 days and rendering such medical attention as possible to his severely burned companion until all were captured. Up to the time of his death while still a captive of the enemy, Lieutenant (Junior Grade) Koelsch steadfastly refused to aid his captors in any manner and served to inspire his fellow prisoners by his fortitude and consideration for others. His great personal valor and heroic spirit of self-sacrifice throughout sustain and enhance the finest traditions of the United States naval service.

Awards
Medal of Honor
Purple Heart
Prisoner of War Medal
American Defense Service Medal
American Campaign Medal
Asiatic–Pacific Campaign Medal
World War II Victory Medal
Navy Occupation Service Medal
National Defense Service Medal
Korean Service Medal
United Nations Korea Medal
Korea Presidential Unit Citation (Korea)
Korean War Service Medal (Korea)
1939–1945 Star (United Kingdom)
War Medal 1939–1945 (United Kingdom)

Namesake
The destroyer escort  (later reclassified as a frigate) was named in his honor.

See also

List of Korean War Medal of Honor recipients

References
Inline

General

1923 births
1951 deaths
United States Navy personnel of the Korean War
American military personnel killed in the Korean War
American Korean War pilots
American prisoners of war in the Korean War
Burials at Arlington National Cemetery
British emigrants to the United States
English-born Medal of Honor recipients
Helicopter pilots
Korean War recipients of the Medal of Honor
People from Briarcliff Manor, New York
United States Navy officers
United States Naval Aviators
United States Navy Medal of Honor recipients
Shot-down aviators